is a Japanese painter and comedian.

Onishi is represented with Yoshimoto Creative Agency.

Filmography

TV series

TV dramas

Films

Others

Advertisements

Bibliography

Art books

Diaries

Photo diaries

Photo books

Calendars

Documents

References

External links

  
 Jimmy Onishi Profile at Yoshimoto Creative Agency 

Japanese comedians
Japanese painters
1964 births
Living people
People from Yao, Osaka
Artists from Osaka Prefecture